Im Dae-won (born August 16, 1976 in Imsil, Jeollabuk-do) is a retired amateur South Korean Greco-Roman wrestler, who competed in the men's featherweight category. He produced a remarkable tally of three career medals, including a silver in the 55-kg division at the 2003 World Wrestling Championships in Créteil, France, and also finished seventh at the 2004 Summer Olympics, representing his nation South Korea. Having worked as a full-time employee for Samsung Sports, Im trained throughout his sporting career as a member of its wrestling team under head coach Ahn Han-bong.

Im highlighted his sporting career at the 2003 World Wrestling Championships in Créteil, France, where he picked up a silver medal in the 55-kg division, losing 5–6 to three-time Olympic veteran Dariusz Jabłoński of Poland. Because of his unprecedented success, Im emerged as one of the top favorites to win a medal for the Olympic Games, and went on to grab another silver at the Asian Championships in Almaty, Kazakhstan by the following year.

At the 2004 Summer Olympics in Athens, Im qualified for the South Korean squad, as a 28-year-old, in the men's 55 kg class. Earlier in the process, he placed second behind Jablonski at the World Championships and guaranteed a spot on South Korea's Olympic wrestling team by obtaining a silver medal from the Asian Championships. He dominated the prelim pool by pulling into a 4–4 tie over Kazakhstan's Nurbakyt Tengizbayev, and dismantling another Olympic veteran Marian Sandu of Romania with a 3–6 verdict to secure him a spot for the next round. As he faced off against eventual Olympic silver medalist Geidar Mamedaliyev of Russia, Im could not hold him tightly to score enough points and lost the match 3–0, placing seventh in the final standings.

References

External links
Profile – International Wrestling Database

1976 births
Living people
South Korean male sport wrestlers
Olympic wrestlers of South Korea
Wrestlers at the 2004 Summer Olympics
People from Imsil County
World Wrestling Championships medalists
Asian Wrestling Championships medalists
Sportspeople from North Jeolla Province
21st-century South Korean people